The 47th Annual Miss Puerto Rico Universe competition was held in the fall of 2001 in Puerto Rico. Isis Casalduc won the pageant and represented Puerto Rico at Miss Universe 2002 in San Juan, Puerto Rico.

Results

Judges

Gustavo Arango
Marie Estela Cestero
David G Latoni
Brenda Liz Lopez

2001 in Puerto Rico
Puerto Rico 2002
2002 beauty pageants